Hilary Godwin Wayment OBE, FSA (1912–2005) was a British author and historian of stained glass.

Early life 

Wayment was born in Woolwich, east London on 23 April 1912, the son of Alfred Wayment, headmaster of the local church school. His godfather Eric Milner-White, a curate at the church of St Mary Magdalen Woolwich, was later Dean of King's College, Cambridge from 1918 to 1941, and became a strong influence on Wayment's life, leading him a near lifelong study of stained glass, particularly the windows of King's College.

He was educated at Charterhouse School, then from 1931–1935 at King's College, where he took a first in Part I of the Classical Tripos before reading English for Part II, and was a chorister. He was a contemporary at King's of Oliver Churchill, with whom he formed a lifelong friendship, and their paths crossed during World War II in Cairo where Wayment was working from 1937–44 and Churchill was posted to SOE Headquarters, Middle East from 1942–45. Wayment was godfather to Churchill's eldest son, Toby.

In 1952 he married Lilah Sykes (née Dixon) and had a son and a daughter.

Career 

From 1937 to 1944 he served as Assistant Lecturer and then Lecturer in English at Fuad I University in Cairo.

He published a collection of poems and stories Egypt Now: a miscellany in 1943, and translated from the French  by Henry Habib Ayrout (published as The Fellaheen, 1945). He also learned Arabic, translating into English the autobiography of the highly influential scholar Taha Hussein (The Stream of Days: a student at the Azhar, 1943).

In 1944 he returned to England and took up a post with the British Council, serving firstly in London, then in Cambridge from 1948–1952, in Brussels from 1952–54, and from 1954–59 as Director of the British Institute in Paris, and 1963–68 in Amsterdam, and Turkey from 1970 to 1973. These periods of residence furthered his research on 16th-century glass, and he formed friendships with other stained-glass scholars.

In 1967 King's College Chapel underwent an extensive cleaning operation for which scaffolding was erected around the building. In 1968–69 Wayment took a sabbatical leave from his British Council post and was elected a Fellow of King's College, Cambridge to take advantage of the scaffolding to systematically study at close quarters and photograph the famous 16th-century cycle of stained glass in the Chapel, according to the precise standards of the  project.
The subsequent large folio volume, The Windows of King's College Chapel, Cambridge published by the British Academy in 1972, was the first and became a standard for the Great Britain CVMA volumes, On retirement from the British Council he was elected a Fellow of Wolfson College, Cambridge from 1973–77 to study the windows of the St Mary's Church, Fairford, in Gloucestershire, which have a close relationship to those at King's, and wrote The Stained Glass of the Church of St Mary, Fairford, Gloucestershire published in 1984.

Four years later he wrote King's College Chapel Cambridge: The Side-chapel Glass.

He died in Cambridge on 20 March 2005 aged 92.

Bibliography

Translations

References 

1912 births
2005 deaths
Fellows of King's College, Cambridge
Fellows of Wolfson College, Cambridge
British stained glass artists and manufacturers
Officers of the Order of the British Empire
People educated at Charterhouse School
People of the British Council
Arabic–English translators
Translators from French
Academic staff of Cairo University
People from Woolwich
20th-century British photographers
20th-century translators
20th-century British historians
Fellows of the Society of Antiquaries of London
Photographers from Cambridgeshire